Kʼinich Kʼukʼ Bahlam II, also known as Bahlum Kʼukʼ II and Mahkʼina Kuk, (fl. c .764-783), was an ajaw of the Maya city of Palenque. He acceded to the throne on March 4, 764 and ruled until c. 783. He was a son of Kʼinich Ahkal Moʼ Nahb III and Lady Men Nik. Knowledge of him is limited to a few broken monuments: the Tablet of the 96 glyphs, the Creation Tablet, the House B Mural? and Bodega no. 218.

Notes

Sources 

Rulers of Palenque
8th-century monarchs in North America
Year of death unknown
8th century in the Maya civilization